Buzz! Junior: Monster Rumble (known as Buzz! Junior: Monster Rally in North America) is the third game in the Buzz! Junior series of games. Buzz! Junior: Monster Rumble was released on 2 November 2007 in Europe. Monster Rumble was co-developed by FreeStyleGames and Magenta Software and is published by Sony Computer Entertainment Europe. FreeStyleGames developed nineteen of the twenty-five mini-games, while Magenta created the following six: Boo!, Bashing Pumpkins, Eyeball Fall, Ghoulish Golf, All Wrapped Up, & Tug-O-War.

The game was later ported  to PlayStation 3 by Cohort Studios and was released on 3 September 2009 as a download from the PlayStation Store. It includes trophy support and the ability to use a DualShock wireless controller instead of Buzzers.

PlayStation 2 Games 
 All Wrapped Up
 Barrel Running
 Bashing Pumpkins
 Boo!
 Bubble Blowing
 Dizzy Dodgems
 Eyeball Fall
 Feeding Time
 Fiendish Frogs
 Freaky Fireworks
 Ghoulish Golf
 Hot Air
 Musical Chairs
 Picture Tennis
 Ping Pong Splat
 Potion Panic
 Pumpkin Catching
 Rock Monsters
 Scary Stilts
 Sewer Flush
 Spare Parts
 Tentacle Terror
 Treasure Hunt
 Tug-O-War
 Turtle Hurling

PlayStation 3 (PSN) Games 
 All Wrapped Up
 Boo!
 Ghoulish Golf
 Musical Chairs
 Treasure Hunt

PlayStation 3 (PSN) Reviews 
Girl Gamers - 7/10
Gamers Digest - 7/10

External links
Official Buzz! Junior: Monster Rumble Trailers
Official Buzz! Junior site

2007 video games
PlayStation 2 games
PlayStation 3 games
PlayStation Network games
Buzz!
Video games developed in the United Kingdom
Multiplayer and single-player video games
Cohort Studios games
Sony Interactive Entertainment games
Magenta Software games